Pittsburgh is home to the first commercial radio station in the United States, KDKA 1020AM; the first community-sponsored television station in the United States, WQED 13; the first "networked" television station and the first station in the country to broadcast 24 hours a day, 7 days a week, KDKA 2; and the first newspaper published west of the Allegheny Mountains, the Pittsburgh Post-Gazette. Until 2016 Pittsburgh was one of the few mid-sized metropolitan areas in the U.S. with two major daily papers; both the Pittsburgh Post-Gazette and the Pittsburgh Tribune-Review have histories of breaking in-depth investigative news stories on a national scale. In 2016, the Tribune-Review moved to an all-digital format. The Post-Gazette moved to publishing five print editions a week in 2018, three print editions a week in 2019, and two print editions a week in 2021. The alternative papers in the region include the Pittsburgh City Paper; Pittsburgh Jewish Chronicle; The New People, published weekly by the Thomas Merton Center for Peace and Social Justice; the New Pittsburgh Courier, one of the larger ethnic publications in the region; and Zajedničar, the only Croatian-language newspaper currently published in the United States. The Pitt News, a financially independent student-written and -managed newspaper of the University of Pittsburgh, is closing in on its 100th year of publication. The University of Pittsburgh School of Law also hosts JURIST, the world's only university-based legal news service.

Newspapers
This is a list of newspapers in Pittsburgh, including print and online.

Major newspapers:
Pittsburgh Post-Gazette
Pittsburgh Tribune-Review
Alternative newspapers:
Pittsburgh City Paper
Pittsburgh Current
Specialty newspapers:
The Bulletin
The Front Weekly
Green Tree Times (western city neighborhoods and suburbs)
Pittsburgh Jewish Chronicle
NewPeople (Published by Thomas Merton Center)
Northside Chronicle (northern city neighborhoods)
Pittsburgh Business Times
Pittsburgh Catholic
Pittsburgh Courier (African-American community)
Print (eastern city neighborhoods)
Pittsburgh Lesbian Correspondents
South Pittsburgh Reporter (southern city neighborhoods and suburbs)
Zajedničar
Academic newspapers:
The Duquesne Duke
The Pitt News
The (CMU) Tartan
University Times
The (PPU) Globe
Online newspapers:
The Incline
NEXTPittsburgh
PublicSource

Magazines and journals
Variety:
Jenesis Magazine
LOCALPittsburgh Magazine
Pittsburgh Magazine
Pittsburgh Parent
Pittsburgh Quarterly
Table Magazine
WHIRL Magazine
Academic:
Contemporaneity: Historical Presence in Visual Culture (digital journal) 
Creative Nonfiction (magazine)
Hot Metal Bridge
Journal of Law and Commerce
Pittsburgh Journal of Environmental and Public Health Law
Pittsburgh Journal of Technology Law & Policy
Pittsburgh Tax Review
Sampsonia Way Magazine
Three Rivers Review
University of Pittsburgh Law Review
Promotional/Alumni
Carlow University Magazine (Carlow University)
Connected (La Roche University)
Pitt Magazine (University of Pittsburgh)
Pitt Med (University of Pittsburgh Health Sciences)
The Point (Point Park University)

Television
The Pittsburgh TV market is currently ranked as the 23rd largest in the United States by Nielsen.  It has recently gained distinction as one of the most competitive. (In the listing below the table, network O&O's are denoted in bold.) The market is served by:

 VHF:
 KDKA 2 (CBS)
 WTAE 4 (ABC)
 WPXI 11 (NBC)
 WQED 13 (PBS)
 This PBS member station is a major contributor to national media as the source for Mister Rogers' Neighborhood, National Geographic Explorer, Where in the World Is Carmen Sandiego?, and Daniel Tiger's Neighborhood.

 UHF:
 WEPA-CD 16 
 WPCW 19 (CW)
 WPNT 22 (MyNetworkTV)
 WIIC-LD 31
 WBYD-CD 39
 WINP 38 (Ion)
 WPCB 40 (Cornerstone)
 WPGH 53 (FOX)

Cable news stations:
Pitt Panthers TV
Pittsburgh Cable News Channel
AT&T SportsNet Pittsburgh

Digital television stations:
KNNP-TV

Radio

Pittsburgh radio has long been dominated by KDKA 1020 AM. However, as of early 2006 the station is no longer No. 1 in the ratings. KQV 1410 AM, now an all-news outlet, was Pittsburgh's dominant Top 40 station throughout the 1960s. On the FM dial, album-rock WDVE (102.5 DVE), modern rock WXDX (105.9 The X), adult contemporary WBZZ (Star 100.7), pop and hip-hop WKST-FM (96.1 KissFM) and Pittsburgh Sports Talk on (93.7 The Fan) KDKA-FM FM talk radio is available in the Pittsburgh market at WPGB (104.7 FM NewsTalk). Pittsburgh is also home to three public radio stations: WESA, the local NPR station; WQED-FM, a listener-supported commercial-free classical music station; and WYEP 91.3FM, the nation's third-largest independent "adult album alternative" (AAA) station, which hosts the locally produced environmental radio show The Allegheny Front and also carries some NPR programming. The Radio Information Service, broadcasting on a subcarrier of WESA provides special programming for the blind and print impaired. Additionally, Pittsburgh hosts the non-commercial radio stations WRCT (affiliated with Carnegie Mellon University) and WPTS (affiliated with the University of Pittsburgh).

DMA

In 2010, Nielsen will continue to rank Pittsburgh as the 23rd largest television Designated Market Area (DMA) in the country, with 1,154,950 households.  That is a drop from Nielsen's 2009 estimate of 1,156,460.  Despite the decline in households, Pittsburgh still has 22,090 more households than the next closest television DMA which is Charlotte, NC.

In 2004 Pittsburgh was the 24th largest DMA in the U.S. as ranked by population, with a population of 2,881,200.

Other definitions of the "Pittsburgh region" extend into Ohio border counties with some sources including several Ohio counties and as far south & west as the Kentucky border and north into the extreme southwest of New York State.

The Pittsburgh DMA includes the following counties:

Pennsylvania counties:

Allegheny
Armstrong
Beaver
Butler
Clarion
Fayette
Forest
Greene
Indiana
Lawrence
Venango
Washington
Westmoreland

West Virginia counties:
Monongalia
Preston

Maryland counties:
Garrett

References

External links
Pittsburgh, PA on American Radio Map (Radiomap.us)

Pittsburgh